Jérémie "Jeremiah" Blanchard (September 27, 1859 – March 17, 1939) was a farmer and political figure in Prince Edward Island. He represented 1st Prince in the Legislative Assembly of Prince Edward Island from 1893 to 1897 as a Conservative and from 1922 to 1931 as a Liberal.

He was born in Rustico, Prince Edward Island, the son of Sylvestre Blanchard and Virginie Doucette. He learned the trade of carpentry from his father. Blanchard was married twice: to Domitilde Gallant in 1880 and to Leonie Gomeau (née DesRoches) in 1921. He was an unsuccessful candidate for a seat in the provincial assembly in 1890 and in 1919. He served in the province's Executive Council as a minister without portfolio.

His grandson Elmer Blanchard also served in the provincial assembly.

References 
 

Progressive Conservative Party of Prince Edward Island MLAs
Prince Edward Island Liberal Party MLAs
1859 births
1939 deaths
People from Prince County, Prince Edward Island